Be Good is the second studio album by American jazz musician Gregory Porter. It was released through Motéma Music on 15 February 2012. The album charted in Belgium, France and the Netherlands.

Reception
John Fordham of The Guardian commented that Porter's live shows in London "balanced plenty of fizzing, fast music and jazz acrobatics with the honeyed tones of Nat King Cole [...] Much of this largely self-penned set operates at more of a smoulder, exploring that distinctive kind of mellow innocence in Porter's articulate lyrics. However, after half-a-dozen lovesongs and mother-cherishing acclamations (including the lullaby-like title track), a little more muscle becomes desirable." Chris Nickson of AllMusic stated: " It's a daring move, and one that works as it showcases the tenderness in his voice, with an almost liquid quality in the singing, the emotions hinted at rather than laid out. It's a superb climax to a disc that should certainly help Porter's star rise even further."

Track listing
All songs written by Gregory Porter, except where noted.

Personnel
Gregory Porter - vocals
Chip Crawford - piano (all tracks, except 12)
Aaron James - bass (exc. 7, 12)
Emanuel Harrold - drums (exc. 7, 12)
Yosuke Sato - alto saxophone (2, 3, 6, 8–11)
Tivon Pennicott - tenor saxophone (2–4, 8, 10, 11)
Keyon Harrold - trumpet (2–4, 8, 10, 11)
Kamau Kenyatta - horn arrangements (2–4, 8, 11)
Production
Brian Bacchus - production
Mike Marciano - recording
Liberty Ellman - mixing and mastering
Rebecca Meek - art direction, design
Vincent Soyez - photography

Charts

Weekly charts

Release history

References

2012 albums
Gregory Porter albums
Motéma Music albums